Ghenadie Olexici  (born 23 August 1978) is a Moldovan former footballer.

Club career
Olexici signed a one-year contract with FC Alania Vladikavkaz in February 2008, but one month later he joined FC Zimbru Chişinău. He moved to Shinnik in July 2008.

International career
Olexici has made 42 appearances for the senior Moldova national football team. He played 9 games in UEFA Euro 2008 qualifying.

References

External links 
 
  Player Stats at weltfussball
 

Moldovan footballers
Moldova international footballers
Association football defenders
Moldovan expatriate footballers
Expatriate footballers in Russia
Moldovan expatriate sportspeople in Russia
FC Amkar Perm players
FC Shinnik Yaroslavl players
FC Zimbru Chișinău players
Russian Premier League players
Footballers from Chișinău
1978 births
Living people